The Guangxiang Bridge is a historic stone arch bridge over the Old City River in Yuecheng District of Shaoxing, Zhejiang, China.

Etymology
Guangxiang Bridge is named after Guangxiang Temple near the bridge.

History
Guangxiang Bridge was originally built in the Eastern Jin (317–420), but because of war and natural disasters has been rebuilt numerous times since then. The present version was completed in 1982.

On 6 May 2013, it was listed among the seventh batch of "Major National Historical and Cultural Sites in Zhejiang" by the State Council of China.

Gallery

References

Bridges in Zhejiang
Arch bridges in China
Bridges completed in 1982
Qing dynasty architecture
Buildings and structures completed in 1982
1982 establishments in China
Major National Historical and Cultural Sites in Zhejiang